The 2020 BWF World Tour (officially known as 2020 HSBC BWF World Tour for sponsorship reasons) was the third season of the BWF World Tour of badminton, a circuit of 26 tournaments which led up to the World Tour Finals tournament. The 27 tournaments are divided into five levels: Level 1 was the said World Tour Finals, Level 2 called Super 1000 (three tournaments), Level 3 called Super 750 (five tournaments), Level 4 called Super 500 (seven tournaments) and Level 5 called Super 300 (11 tournaments). Each of these tournaments offers different ranking points and prize money. The highest points and prize pool were offered at the Super 1000 level (including the World Tour Finals). 

One other category of tournament, the BWF Tour Super 100 (level 6), also offers BWF World Tour ranking points. Although this level is not part of the BWF World Tour, it is an important part of the pathway and entry point for players into the BWF World Tour tournaments. When the 10 Level 6 grade tournaments of the BWF Tour Super 100 are included, the complete tour consists of 37 tournaments.

Results 
Below is the schedule released by the Badminton World Federation:

Key

Winners

Finals 
This is the complete schedule of events on the 2020 calendar, with the champions and runners-up documented.

January

February

March

April

May 
No World Tour tournaments was held in May.

June

July

August

September

October

November

December

January 2021

Statistics

Performance by countries 
Below are the 2020 BWF World Tour performances by countries. Only countries who have won a title are listed:

 BWF World Tour

 BWF Tour Super 100

Performance by categories 
Accurate as of XD final (5/5 matches) of the 2020 BWF World Tour Finals.

Men's singles

Women's singles

Men's doubles

Women's doubles

Mixed doubles

World Tour Finals rankings 
The points are calculated from the following tournaments:
2019 Syed Modi International
2020 Malaysia Masters
2020 Indonesia Masters
2020 Thailand Masters
2020 Spain Masters
2020 All England Open
2020 Denmark Open
2020 Yonex Thailand Open
2020 Toyota Thailand Open

The player who will have the eligibility of 2020 BWF World Tour Finals needs to enter both 2020 Yonex Thailand Open and 2020 Toyota Thailand Open.

Information on Points, Won, Lost, and % columns were calculated after the 2020 BWF World Tour Finals.
Key

Men's singles 
The table below is based on the ranking of men's singles as of 26 January 2021.

Women's singles 
The table below is based on the ranking of women's singles as of 26 January 2021.

Men's doubles 
The table below is based on the ranking of men's doubles as of 26 January 2021.

Women's doubles 
The table below is based on the ranking of women's doubles as of 26 January 2021.

Mixed doubles 
The table below is based on the ranking of mixed doubles as of 26 January 2021.

References 

 
World Tour
BWF World Tour